Neeraj Bist (born 3 April 1990) is an Indian former cricketer. He played two List A matches for Hyderabad in 2010.

See also
 List of Hyderabad cricketers

References

External links
 

1990 births
Living people
Indian cricketers
Hyderabad cricketers
Cricketers from Hyderabad, India